Nirajan Rayamajhi (born 29 January 1980) is a Nepalese former professional footballer. He last played as a striker for the Nepal national football team and New Road Team (N.R.T.) Rayamajhi is best known for his performance with the Nepal national team. He scored a hat trick for the national team against Macau in the 2002 World Cup qualification round. Rayamajhi is Nepal's top scorer of all time - along with Hari Khadka - scoring 13 goals for Nepal. He retired from Nepal's national team in 2006.

Early life
Rayamajhi was born in Mulpani, Kathmandu, the capital city of Nepal. His uncle and brother played on the football grounds of Mulpani, and he used to accompany them as a child. He started to play inter-ward football and participated in local-level tournaments. His father worked in the municipality and had acquaintance with officers of Ranipokhari Corner team (RCT), which led him to join the club. He played with RCT for five years, in the Martyr's Memorial B-Division League. This led him to play in the Martyr's Memorial A-Division League. He was the top scorer in the league, resulting in his selection for the national team.

National team
At age 21, he debuted for the national team. Despite losing to Iraq, he scored a consolation goal. He scored a hat-trick against Macau in the 2002 World Cup qualification round. He was in form until 2004 and was never benched. He became the top scorer for the national team.

Club life
Due to his strong performance with the national team, he got the chance to play for clubs including Friends Club and Three Star Club. Rayamajhi went to Germany to play and improve his technique. He learned that FIFA does not allow players of teams with low FIFA rankings to play in upper division leagues of high-profile nations. He joined the 4th division club Ornek and played for some years.  Due to financial problems, he left football and started a job.

Return to national team
He returned to Nepal in 2005 and re-joined the Three Star Club. After a year, he was called up by the national team. At the same time, he joined NRT club. He couldn't regain form and finally retired from the national team after playing an international friendly against Palestine.

International goals 

Scores and results list Nepal's goal tally first.

References

Living people
1980 births
Nepalese footballers
Nepal international footballers
Ranipokhari Corner Team players
Association football forwards